The 2010 FIBA Africa Women's Clubs Champions Cup (16th edition), was an international basketball tournament  held in Bizerte, Tunisia, from November 19 to 27, 2010. The tournament, organized by FIBA Africa, and hosted by CSF Bizerte, was contested by 10 clubs split into 2 groups, the first four of which qualifying for the knock-out stage and the last four playing the consolation places.
 
The tournament was won by Interclube from Angola.

Draw

Squads

Qualification

Preliminary rounds
Times given below are in UTC+1.

Group A

Group B

Knockout stage

Quarter-finals

9th place

5th-8th place

Semifinals

7th place

5th place

Bronze medal game

Gold medal game

Final standings

Interclube rosterAstrida Vicente, Catarina Camufal, Danielle Green, Felizarda Jorge, Irene Guerreiro, Nadir Manuel, Ngiendula Filipe, Sónia Guadalupe, Coach: Apolinário Paquete

All Tournament Team

See also 
 2011 FIBA Africa Championship for Women

References

External links 
 2010 FIBA Africa Champions Cup for Women Official Website
 

2010 FIBA Africa Women's Clubs Champions Cup
2010 FIBA Africa Women's Clubs Champions Cup
2010 FIBA Africa Women's Clubs Champions Cup
FIBA